This is a list of South Korean films that received a domestic theatrical release in 2012.

Box office
The highest-grossing South Korean films released in 2012, by domestic box office gross revenue, are as follows:

Released

See also
 2012 in South Korea
 2012 in South Korean music
 List of Korean-language films
 List of South Korean actresses
 List of South Korean male actors

References

External links 
2012 in South Korea

 Korean Film Council website
List of 2012 box office number-one films in South Korea

2012
Box
South Korean